The Grammy Award for Best Classical Album  was awarded from 1962 to 2011.  The award had several minor name changes:

From 1962 to 1963, 1965 to 1972 and 1974 to 1976 the award was known as Album of the Year – Classical
In 1964 and 1977 it was awarded as Classical Album of the Year
In 1973 and from 1978 onward it was awarded as Best Classical Album

The award was discontinued in 2012 in a major overhaul of Grammy categories. From then on, recordings in this category fall under the Album of the Year category. 

Years reflect the year in which the Grammy Awards were presented, for works released in the previous year.

Winners and nominees

References

Grammy Awards for classical music
Classical Album
Album awards